Gretton is a surname. Notable people with the surname include:

George Gretton (born 1950), Scottish lawyer and academic
Jennifer Gretton, Baroness Gretton (born 1943), English baroness
Peter Gretton (1912–1992), Admiral in the Royal Navy
Rob Gretton (1953–1999), Musicians' manager
William Gretton (1736–1813), a master of Magdalene College, Cambridge